The 2023 World Wushu Championships will be the 16th edition of the World Wushu Championships. The official website is 16th World Wushu Championships.

During the IWUF Congress at the 2019 World Wushu Championships, it was announced that the next edition of the WWC would be held in 2021 in Dallas, Texas, United States. On July 15, 2021, the IWUF virtual congress postponed the 16th WWC to 2023. On September 15, 2022, the United States of America Wushu Kungfu Federation announced that the competition will take place in November 2023 at the Fort Worth Convention Center.

Medal summary

Medal table

Men's taolu

Men's sanda

Women's taolu

Women's sanda

References

External links

 Official website

World Wushu Championships
Wushu in the United States
International sports competitions hosted by the United States
Wushu
Wushu competitions in the United States
World Wushu Championships
Sports competitions in Fort Worth, Texas
2023 in sports in Texas
2023 in wushu (sport)
World Wushu